The Chaska Bridge is a 4-lane vehicular bridge crossing the Minnesota River on the south side of downtown Chaska, carrying Minnesota State Highway 41.

History 
When the former bridge was replaced, it was the second busiest two lane bridge in Minnesota (behind the Hastings High Bridge on US 61.) The replacement project allowed for two lanes open at a time by only building one half of the new bridge, and demolishing the old bridge, and then building the other half. Traffic went down the middle to polish off the permanent edges. The bridge had been decorated with the city of Chaska with murals, lighting, and stonework. Signs at each end displayed the city name. This bridge opened in mid-2006, and the project was finished in late 2007.

See also
 List of crossings of the Minnesota River

References

Road bridges in Minnesota
Bridges completed in 2006
Bridges over the Minnesota River
Buildings and structures in Carver County, Minnesota